An act to eliminate the 2013 statutory pay adjustment for Federal employees is a bill that was introduced into and passed by the United States House of Representatives in the 113th United States Congress.  It was introduced by Rep. Ron DeSantis (R-FL) on January 15, 2013 and it passed the House with a vote of 261-154 on February 15, 2013.

The bill would prevent a 0.5% pay increase for all federal workers from taking effect, continuing a pay freeze that has been in effect since 2011.  According to the Congressional Budget Office, this measure would save the federal government $11 billion over 10 years.

Background
In December 2010, President Obama issued executive order 13561 carrying out a two-year federal employee pay freeze.  Two years later, on December 27, 2012, he issued a new order, Executive Order #13635, which would end the pay freeze and give civilian federal employees a 0.5% raise in 2013.  The bill was proposed in response to this executive order.

Procedural history

Introduction
The bill was introduced into the House by Rep. Ron DeSantis (R-FL) on January 15, 2013.  By the time the Bill has passed in the House, H.R. 273 had gained 48 co-sponsors, all of them Republicans.  The Bill was referred to the United States House Committee on Oversight and Government Reform.  The Bill was freshman congressman Ron DeSantis' first bill introduced in Congress.

Passage in the House
The Bill passed the House on February 15, 2013 with a vote of 261-154.  The vote was Roll No. 44.  218 Republicans voted in favor, with only 10 voting against.  43 Democrats voted in favor, with 144 against.

Referral to the Senate
The Bill was referred to the United States Senate Committee on Homeland Security and Governmental Affairs.

The Bill did not pass the Democratic-controlled Senate.

Provisions of the Bill
The Bill would amend the Continuing Appropriations Act of 2011 (which was itself amended by the Continuing Appropriations Resolution, 2013), to extend through December 31, 2013: (1) the freeze on statutory pay adjustments for federal employees and officials, and (2) the prohibition against any member of the Senior Executive Service or any senior level employee in the executive branch from receiving an increase in his or her rate of basic pay absent a change of position that results in a substantial increase in responsibility or a promotion.

The Bill also would eliminate the delayed statutory pay adjustment contained in the 2013 Continuing Appropriations Resolution that was permitted to take effect with the first applicable pay period beginning after March 27, 2013.

The Bill would only prevent an across-the-board increase to all federal employees' pay.  It would not effect merit pay, promotions, or tenure based pay increases.

According to the nonpartisan Congressional Budget Office, enacting the Bill would save the government $11 billion over 10 years.

Arguments in favor
Republican lawmakers, such as Rep. Rob Woodall (R-GA), argued that it was necessary to freeze federal pay due to the debt crisis the government faced and further argued that this was appropriate because federal workers already make more money on average than their private sector counterparts, according to a 2012 Congressional Budget Office report.

The two-year pay freeze that federal workers experienced was originally recommended by the bipartisan Simpson-Bowles Commission to last three-years instead of two.

The Bill was supported by conservative groups such as the Club for Growth, Heritage Action for America, the National Taxpayers Union, Americans for Tax Reform, and FreedomWorks.

Arguments against
The White House released a statement opposing the Bill, arguing that federal workers had not received any raises since 2011.  The President did not, however, threaten to veto the Bill.  Federal employee unions, as well as organizations such as the National Active and Retired Federal Employees Association, also expressed opposition to the Bill.  Joseph Beaudoin, the President of NARFE, argued that “continuing the pay freeze will only exacerbate the problem of an underpaid federal workforce and weaken the quality of our federal civil service over time.”

Other arguments against the Bill included one from Rep. Bill Pascrell (D-NJ) who said that “this is one of the dumbest bills I’ve ever seen come to this floor” because any savings would not significantly affect the deficit.

See also
General Schedule (US civil service pay scale)
United States Congress#Privileges and pay
Executive Schedule
National debt of the United States

Notes/References

External links

Thomas (thomas.loc.gov) H.R. 273
beta.congress.gov H.R. 273
GovTrack.us H.R. 273
OpenCongress.org H.R. 273
WashingtonWatch.com H.R. 273
GOP.gov - House Republicans' H.R. 273 page
Article from Rep. DeSantis on H.R. 273

Proposed legislation of the 113th United States Congress